Guy Reyntiens (26 August 1880 – 24 June 1932) was a Belgian equestrian. He competed in three events at the 1912 Summer Olympics.

References

External links
 

1880 births
1932 deaths
Belgian male equestrians
Olympic equestrians of Belgium
Equestrians at the 1912 Summer Olympics
Place of birth missing